Kumanovo (also known by other alternative names) is a city in North Macedonia and the seat of Kumanovo Municipality, the largest municipality in the country. Skopje airport also serves Kumanovo.

It has many historical sites. It is ranked fourth on the list of old observatories by NASA.
 
In 1912, during the First Balkan War, Serbian forces won a decisive victory over the Ottomans north of the town. The two-day Battle of Kumanovo ended Ottoman authority in Vardar Macedonia which contributed to the region's integration into Serbia, and consequently, into Yugoslavia. The entire region of Macedonia was split in three among Serbia, Greece and Bulgaria after the Treaty of Bucharest in 1913.

The rapid economic, administrative and cultural expansion of Kumanovo began in 1945. It was the site of the 9 June 1999 Agreement signed between FR Yugoslav Generals and the NATO Generals about bringing in a NATO peacekeeping contingent in Kosovo called, the Kosovo Force, or KFOR (Kumanovo Agreement). The town's metal-processing, tobacco, agriculture, footwear and textile industries have made it an economic, trading and cultural center of approximately 135,529 people. It is internationally known for a jazz festival hosting bands from all over the world.

Etymology
The name of the city in Macedonian, Serbian and Bulgarian is Kumanovo (Куманово). Kumanovo derives from the name of the Cumans, a western branch of Kipchaks, the tribe that settled in the area in the early 12th century.

Geography
Kumanovo is situated in the northeastern part of North Macedonia, near the capital city of Skopje.
 the Karadag part of Skopska Crna Gora mountain on its western side,
 Gradištanska mountain on its southern side, and
 Mangovica and German mountain on the Eastern side.

Skopje airport also serves Kumanovo.

Climate
Kumanovo has a humid subtropical climate (Köppen climate classification: Cfa).

Neighbourhoods
 Goce Delčev,
 Zelen Rid,
 Pero Čičo (Banevo Trlo),
 Karpoš (Rajkova Kuka), 
Ajdučka Češma,
 Sokolana,
 Igo Tričkovik (Pukovsko),
 Vera Kotorka (Dobrošane),
 Bedinje,
 Jane Sandanski (Babin Dol),
 Sredorek.

Streets
 Oktomvriska Revolucija,
 Gorče Petrov,
 Treta Makedonska Udarna Brigada,
 Goce Delčev,
 Narodna Revolucija,
 Nikola Tesla,
 Leninova,
 11 Oktomvri,
 Moša Pijade,
 Ivo Lola Ribar,
 Srbo Tomovik,
 Tode Mendol,
 Karaorman 
 Pero Čičo,
 Esperanto,
 Bajram Shabani,
 Franc Rozman.
 Straso Pindjur

Old neighborhoods
Most old neighborhood consist of shops and very few houses.

Veleshka Maalo (or Veleshko Maalo) is an old neighbourhood of Kumanovo. The name comes from the merchants from the town of Veles, who passed through the neighbourhood to sell their products by the rivers Vardar and Pchinja, and the Konjarinja villages Studena, Bara and Krasta. The main street, which today is named Narodna Revolucija, was their shortest way to the center of the city.

Karapsko maalo was located across today's south side of Goce Delchev High School through to the end of Mosha Pijade street. The name of the neighborhood came from the Ottomans. Every house in the neighborhood had a yard; neighboring yard were connected with doors, used by anyone chased by the Ottomans. Macedonians, komits and revolutionaries used this scheme to escape to the towns outskirts and the town itself. The Ottomans called it the dark or the secret neighborhood.

Also,
 Varoš maalo,
 Endek maalo,
 Muhamedbegovo maalo,
 Ortabunar maalo,
 Bedinsko maalo,
 Novo maalo,
 Lipkovsko maalo,
 Teke maalo,
 Tatar maalo and
 Muandzisko maalo,
 Sokolana maalo.

Endek maalo was placed across today's city hall on two banks of the former river of Serava.

Old streets
 Opančarsko sokače,
 Nagorički sokak,
 Proevski sokak,
 Veleški sokak,
 Romanovski sokak,
 Ukumat sokak and
 Vranjsko Dzade.

Military installations
The military base Boro Menkov is one of the military installations of ARM in Kumanovo. The base was established by the JNA.

MB Hristijan Todorovski Karposh is the second base in Kumanovo, it was also established by the JNA and was inherited by the ARM. Today, part of the installation is converted into a university, and another part was inherited by the Ministry of Interior. There was an idea of turning the base into an economic industrial zone.

In Kumanovo's Elezov kamen area there is also a Military Warehouse Base that operates today.

Police station
Kumanovo has a police station, under the Ministry of Internal Affairs. The current police chief is Stojanče Veličkovikj.

History

Prehistory
The area boasts several prehistoric settlements, among which are
 the Kostoperska Karpa,
 the Bronze Age Gradiste near the village of Pelince,
 the Neolithic site of Mlado Nagoričane,
 the Iron Age tumulus Groblje at Vojnik,
 the Roman Necropolis Drezga of Lopate, and
 the Roman Settlement Vicianus at village of Klečovce.

Middle Ages

The first written mentioning of the individual modern villages of the Kumanovo region originate in the 14th century. These are, for the most part, found in Serbian charters:
 of King Stefan Milutin,
 Emperor Stefan Dušan,
 Sevastokrator Dejan,
 Jevdokija Dejanović, and Dejan's sons,
 Jovan and
 Konstantin.
In this time, the Kumanovo region (old Žegligovo) received its geographical location and certain settlement picture.

According to a charter of the monastery of Arhiljevica dated 1355, sevastokrator Dejan held a major domain (oblast) east of Skopska Crna Gora. It included the old župe (counties) of Žegligovo and Preševo (modern Kumanovo region with Sredorek and Kozjačija).

Ottoman period
The town was mentioned in 1530 according to registry of Turkish Devlet Arşivleri as a village in Nogoriçe town, within Kaza of İştip. It was founded by Turkish colonists from Asia Minor and initially was settled by Turks and later by Muslim Albanians. Slavic population entered the town in the late 18th century but its number rose just during early 19th century. Evliya Çelebi described it in 1660–61: "The colony of Kumanovo is situated on the territory of the Skopje sanjak and represents one county. The city is embellished with many rivers and 600 tile-roofs houses. The mosque in the downtown is beautiful, there are tekke, madrassa, hammam, a number of shops and water mills; and the climate is pleasant and agreeable. There are many vineyards and gardens".

In 1689, Karposh, a brigand commander in the region of Dospat (present-day Bulgaria), who served as an Ottoman Christian auxiliary force commander, took advantage of the weakening of the Ottomans and discontent that arose concerning higher Ottoman taxation policies, and organized a revolt while Austria staged an attack on the Ottomans. Karposh's Rebellion quickly spread, resulting in the liberation of Kratovo, Kriva Palanka, Kumanovo, Kačanik and other towns. Then, together with the Austrian army led by Emperor Leopold I, the local Christian population fought to liberate Skopje and Štip. Later changes in the military and political situation in the Balkans had crucial downwards effect on the revolt. The Austrian army was forced to withdraw and the reinforced Ottomans attacked the rebels, taking Kriva Palanka, the rebel stronghold, and then attacked Kumanovo and its newly constructed fortress, where they captured Karposh and put him to death on the Stone Bridge across the Vardar.

Kumanovo became an urban settlement and administrative center of the region at the end of the 16th century or the beginning of the 17th century. Following the turbulent events (including the Karpoš Uprising in 1689) the city experienced a period of stagnation, and by the end of 18th century Kumanovo epitomized an Ottoman provincial town.

In an 1861 book Austrian diplomat Johann Georg von Hahn stated that the town had 650 dwellings, of which 300 were Muslim and 350 were Christian Bulgarian, in addition to 30 Gypsy in the outskirts, while the total population of the town was 3,500.

The Kumanovo Uprising, led by Serb district chiefs of Kumanovo and surrounding districts, was active from 20 January to 20 May 1878 (4 months). The chiefs swore oath in the local church and appealed to Prince Milan IV of Serbia to aid the uprising, and they pledged their devotion and loyalty, and union with Serbia. The rebels were finally defeated by brigadier-general Hafuz Pasha.

The Skopje Revolutionary district of the Internal Macedonian Revolutionary Organization (IMRO) decided in 1894 that it would organize a committee in Kumanovo, which was later established in the house of Jordan Jovčev, member of the local Bulgarian school board. The committee included also the chief Bulgarian teacher in the town Iliya Levkov, the secretary of the Bulgarian metropolitan deputy Traiche Mitev, priest Andon, his son and Bulgarian teacher Psaltir Popandontov, the merchant Zafir Tasev, elder of the Kumanovo Bulgarian community the Bulgarian teacher Zafir Shaklev  and Angel Prekodolka. They organized the assassination of Serbian priest Atanasije Petrovic.

First Balkan War 

In October 1912, during the First Balkan War, Serbian forces under the command of General Radomir Putnik won a decisive victory over the Ottomans north of the town. The two-day Battle of Kumanovo ended Ottoman authority in Vardar Macedonia and contributed for region's integration into Serbia, and consequently, into Yugoslavia. The entire region of Macedonia was split in three among Serbia, Greece and Bulgaria after the Treaty of Bucharest in 1913.

World War II

The communist resistance in Kumanovo and Prilep began on 11 October 1941. The struggle ended with victory and formation of the Macedonian federated state within the Yugoslav Federation (SFRY). One of the famous partizans from Kumanovo was Hristijan Todorovski-Karpoš shown on the picture. After 1945 Kumanovo experienced fast economic, administrative and cultural development.

Modern history

It developed economically in the late 19th century (agriculture, handcrafts and trade). Still, industrial development occurred only at the end of the Second World War. The rapid economic, administrative and cultural expansion of Kumanovo began in 1945. Today, it is a modern city with approximately 100,000 inhabitants. It was also the site of the 9 June 1999 Agreement signed between FR Yugoslav Generals and the NATO Generals about bringing in a NATO peacekeeping contingent in Kosovo called, the Kosovo Force, or KFOR (Kumanovo Agreement).

2001 Albanian insurgency and Inter-community relations

The Albanian insurgency in Macedonia first started in the mountains outskirts of Tetovo and then spread in May 2001 to the region of Kumanovo mostly to the north. The armed conflict in Kumanovo mainly resulted in a division of the educational system along ethnic lines. All the Albanian-language students left the schools and demanded new schools to be opened. Following this process there is a visible separation in the town affecting the inter-community relations. The Law on Local Self-Government, Article 44 (Sl.vesnik br.5/2002), envisages the establishment of the Commission for Inter-community Relations (CICR). CICR is a consultative body in the Council of the Municipality of Kumanovo and is formed by 12 representatives of the
 Macedonian,
 Albanian,
 Roma,
 Serbian,
 Turkish and
 Vlach
ethnic groups. CICR aims to develop and improve relations between the ethnic communities and to ensure active participation of minorities in decision-making on issues that have ethnic nature and are found in the agenda of the Council of the Municipality of Kumanovo. Other organizations active in bridging the community divide include

 the Center for Intercultural Dialogue (CID),
 Roma community center DROM,
 National Roma Centrum,
 the local Red Cross and others.
One of the most effective systems for supporting the inter-community divide is through the youth centers MultiKulti managed by CID Kumanovo. These centers offer space for youngsters to meet, and apart from learning about each other, they also get youth work support.

2015 clashes 

The NLA had claimed responsibility for a grenade attack on Kumanovo's police station in late 2014. During a police raid on 9 May 2015, a shootout erupted between Macedonian police forces and an armed group. Eight Macedonian policemen and 14 armed men were killed, while 37 officers were wounded and hospitalized. The attack ended on 10 May 2015 in an operation by the police and armed forces. Thirty men were arrested and charged with terrorism by Macedonian authorities.

Economy
The town's metal-processing, tobacco, agriculture, footwear and textile industries have made it an economic, trading and cultural center of approximately 135,529 people. Agriculture and trade developed mainly in the 19th century, but the city's modern look was established after the Second World War.

In 2013, the Macedonian Government published a list of companies with the highest revenue. Four companies from Kumanovo are on this list. In 72nd place is KVALITET-PROM DOOEL with 24,643,312 euros, 130th place is DETOIL DOO with 14,912,153 euros, 142nd place is EKSTRA MEIN DOOEL with 13,231,496 euros, and 151st place is 11 OKTOMVRI AD with 12,878,225 euros revenue. The most profitable company in that same year was PROSTOR DOO with 1,458,759.85 euros profit before taxes.

Infrastructure

Railway

A railway connection exists between Skopje with Serbia via Kumanovo.

In 2013, rehabilitation of the railway section between Kumanovo and the village of Beljakovce will commence, which is part of the Railway Corridor VIII that will connect North Macedonia with Sofia, Bulgaria and the Black Sea to the East and Tirana, Albania and the Adriatic Sea to the West.

Roads

A 40 kilometre highway exists between Skopje and Kumanovo, going near Kumanovo in the north and crossing the border with Serbia. On the section Kumanovo-Miladinovci there is a Pay tool.

Section of the Pan-European Corridor X was put into use in 2010 connecting Kumanovo to the border crossing Tabanovce. The  highway was built for 4 years and at a cost of 15.5 million Euros.

Another important road goes from Kumanovo to Kriva Palanka and then to the border with Bulgaria.

Air Travel

The E-75 motorway is accessible from Kumanovo.

Near Kumanovo is Adzi Tepe Airport which is without a paved runway.

Culture

Monuments and Landmarks
Kumanovo has several prehistoric monuments dating back to the prehistoric period, including:
, an archaeological site from the Bronze Age near the village of Pelince
 Near the village of Mlado Nagoričane is another interesting site dating from the period of Neolith. 
 Near the village of Lopate is the Drezga place that represents a Roman necropolis.
It is ranked fourth on the list of old observatories by NASA. 
Sculpture of Batko Gjorgjija in the city center
 Monument Four Poles also located in the center of the city on the main square,
 Memorial Ossuary and
 House Museum of Hristijan Todorovski Karpoš.

The oldest and biggest church in the town is the St. Nicholas. There are icons from the 13th century in the church. The church represents a masterwork of Andreja Damjanov, an important Macedonian renaissance architect.
 Church Holy Trinity built in 1902,
 Church of St. George,
 Church of St. Petka in the village of Mlado Nagoričane,
 the Karpino Monastery,
 the Ascension of Holy Mother in the village of Matejče,
 Eski Mosque built in 1532,
 Monument Zebrnjak,
 Kumanovska Banja in the village of Proevce and 
 Sports Hall Sokolana.

Other landmarks are:
 statue of Woman Fighter,
buildings: 
 Zanatski dom and
 Kasapski Krug
and
 ASNOM memorial center in the village Pelince.

Cultural organizations

The oldest folklore assemble in North Macedonia, KUD "Panče Pešev" is placed in Kumanovo. This year the assemble is celebrating 80 years of existence.

Kumanovo has
 a library " Tane Georgievski Library",
 cultural center Trajko Prokopiev,
 museum and
 theatre.

Several painting colonies and exhibitions take place every year in Kumanovo or in nearby villages.

Kumanovo is distinguished by its jazz festival which features bands from all over the world. In 2002 the Macedonian bands Foltin and Dragan Dautovski Quartet performed, and in 2003 Macedonian jazz pianist Simon Kiselicki performed in his 'Beneventan Trio'. Every year Kumanovo has a "Days of Comedy" festival, sponsored by the Macedonian Ministry of Culture, featuring comedies from several Macedonian theatres and also from neighbouring Serbia and Bulgaria. Kumanovo municipality was organizing the manifestation "City of Culture 2006".

Demographics

Historical
The following is a table of historical visits to Kumanovo, along with the number of houses recorded by the visitor.

Table below showing historic demographic development according to Yugoslav and Macedonian census data:

Present-day
The population of the city of Kumanovo according to the 2002 census numbers 77,561, the majority of which are ethnic Macedonians 62.4% (48,416), with a significant minority of ethnic Albanians 23.7% (18,369) and ethnic Serbs 7.4% (5,746).

The most common mother tongues in the city were the following:

Macedonian, 45,306 (64.0%)
Albanian, 18,283 (25.8%)
Romani, 4,007 (5.7%)
Serbian, 2,399 (3.4%)
Turkish, 215 (0.3%)
others, 632 (0.9%)

The religious composition of the city was the following:

Eastern Orthodox Christians, 46,766 (66.0%)
Muslims, 22,483 (31.7%)
others, 1,593 (2.3%)

People

In 2009 marking the 490 years of the first mentioning of the name Kumanovo and 65 years of the liberation of Kumanovo, the Municipality of Kumanovo organized a cultural and artistic program in which they honored the Five impressive people from Kumanovo in the 20th century:
Vasil Iljoski, writer, dramatist and professor
Trajko Prokopiev, composer
Vladimir Antonov, architect
Hristijan Todorovski Karpoš, partisan
Saltir Putinski, mayor

Sport

FK Kumanovo is the main football team from the city and host their games at the Kumanovo Park Stadium. Milano plays its games at Milano Arena. KF Goblen has played in the Macedonian Second Football League and FK Karpoš 93 in the OFS Kumanovo First Division.

Macedonian National Football Team played friendly match with Egypt in Kumanovo on 29 September 1998. The game took place at Gradski Stadium Kumanovo and the scorers for Macedonian team were Srgjan Zaharievski and Dževdet Šainovski. The match ended 2:2.

RK Kumanovo is the handball club that currently competes in the Macedonian Handball Super League. They won the first ever Macedonian Handball Cup back in 1992–93.

Also, Kumanovo is recognized as a box school center, with few names emerged as famous in the 20th century, with Ace Rusevski and Redžep Redžepovski as a leading names.

Media

Telecommunication operators

 A1 Macedonia (América Móvil)
 Green Mobile
 IP Systems
 K-Net
 Lycamobile
 Makedonski Telekom (Deutsche Telekom)
 Mtel (Telekom Srbija)
 Multimedia Net
 Telekabel
 Total TV (SBB)

TV Stations

 TV Plus 
 Festa 
 Hana  (Closed)
 Nova  (Closed)
 KTL  (Closed)
 RTK  (Closed)
 K3, Regional, HQ in Kumanovo,  (Closed)
 KRT  (Closed)

Radio stations

Radio Bum 
Radio Bravo 
Jehona 103.5 FM 
City FM  (Closed)

Newspapers

 Ploshtad newspaper (closed)
 Nash Vesnik (closed)
 Dedo Ivan (closed)
 Oktobris (closed)

Gallery

Diplomatic missions
 Honorary Consulate

Twin towns – sister cities

Kumanovo is twinned with:

 Banja Luka, Bosnia and Herzegovina
 Bijeljina, Bosnia and Herzegovina
 Câmpina, Romania
 Çorlu, Turkey
 Čukarica (Belgrade), Serbia
 Gabrovo, Bulgaria
 Gjilan, Kosovo
 Gornji Milanovac, Serbia
 Leskovac, Serbia
 Nikšić, Montenegro
 Novi Sad, Serbia
 Pančevo, Serbia
 Plovdiv, Bulgaria
 Vranje, Serbia

See also

List of people from Kumanovo
List of mayors of Kumanovo
Kumanovo dialect
Kumanovo Municipality
Buildings and Structures in Kumanovo
Karposh's Rebellion
Battle of Kumanovo
Coat of arms of Kumanovo
Kumanovo Treaty
Gradski Stadium Kumanovo
Kumani
Kumanovo Prison
Timeline of Kumanovo
Diocese of Kumanovo and Osogovo
Muftiship of Kumanovo

References

Sources

External links

Official Web Site of Kumanovo
Kumanovo daily news
Kumanovo FAQ
Kokino megalithic observatory
Kokino ancient observatory
Kumanovo jazz festival
Web Site of Kumanovo
Kumani Zapad

 
Cities in North Macedonia
Kumanovo Municipality